Florence Katz is a contemporary French lyrical artist. A mezzo-soprano, graduated from the Conservatoire de Paris, she is also a singing teacher at the Conservatory of Bourg-la-Reine/Sceaux. Florence Katz specializes in the French repertoire. She is a recipient of the Darius Milhaud Prize.

Education 
A pupil of Régine Crespin and Gabriel Bacquier at the Conservatoire de Paris, Katz completed three years of training at the Studio of the Centre de Musique Baroque de Versailles (conducted by Rachel Yakar and René Jacobs, then Marc Minkowski), as well as master classes with Daniel Ferro, Ileana Cotrubas, Suzanne Danco, Irène Joachim, Gérard Lesne, Janine Reiss, Gérard Souzay...

Florence Katz sang under the direction of Jonathan Darlington, Emmanuelle Haïm, Marc Minkowski, Manuel Rosenthal, Christophe Rousset, Marc Soustrot... with the complicity of pianists David Abramovitz, Solange Chiapparin, Jeff Cohen, Serge Cyferstein, Billy Eidi, Marie-Catherine Girod, Christian Ivaldi, Maciej Pikulski, Alain Planès, Mercedes Proteau, Laure Rivierre, Marie-Pascale Talbot, Alexandre Tharaud, Jean-François Zygel... and with Leonie Rysanek, Lucia Valentini Terrani, Rockwell Blake, Ruggero Raimondi...

Katz performed in Paris (Auditorium du Louvre, Invalides, Musée d'Orsay, Opéra-comique, Opéra Bastille, Salle Cortot, Salle Pleyel, Sorbonne,...), Versailles (Opéra du château, Trianon, Théâtre de la Reine, Théâtre Montansier...), Marseille, Aix-en-Provence, Lille, Lyon, Strasbourg, Geneva, Munich, Dresde, Madrid, Kiev...

Prizes and distinctions 
 Singing and Art lyrique prizes of the Conservatoire de Paris
 Prix Honegger and SACEM at the international competition of French melodists
 1st Prize unanimously at the Darius Milhaud competition
 Prix Roussel at the international competition of La Plaine-sur-Mer
 Winner, unanimously, of the Yehudi Menuhin Foundation
 Winner of the "forum de la mélodie et du Lied" (organised by the Culture Ministry)

Concerts  
 Debut at 22 years at the Théâtre des Champs-Élysées, as La Périchole, directed by Jérôme Savary. 
 Roles of Dorabella (Cosi fan tutte / Mozart), Metella (La Vie parisienne / Offenbach), Sorceress (Dido and Aeneas / Purcell)...
 Recitals with piano or instrumental ensembles, in France and Europe.

Discography 
 Gabriel Fauré / Ernest Chausson. Mélodies sur des poètes symbolistes (Lyrinx)
 Darius Milhaud. Alissa et autres poèmes en prose (Timpani)
 Maurice Emmanuel. Integral melodies (Timpani)
 Guy Sacre. Melodies (Timpani)
 Gabriel Dupont. Integral melodies (Timpani)
 Maurice Emmanuel. XXX chansons bourguignonnes (Naxos Records)
 Arthur Honegger. 6 poems by Jean Cocteau / Darius Milhaud. Les machines agricoles (Naxos) 
 André Jolivet: Poems for the child (and other works) (ADDA) 
 Darius Milhaud: Vocal quartets (ADDA)
 Monic Cecconi-Botella: Le Tombeau de Van Gogh. (REM)
 Monteverdi, Rossini, Fauré. Soundtrack of the film The sentinel by A. Desplechin (Delabel / Virgin Musique)
 Jean-Philippe Rameau: Hippolyte et Aricie - role of Oenone (Arkiv prod./Deutsche Grammophon)

References

External links 
 Official website
 Florence Katz on Viadeo.com
 Florence Katz n'a pas fini de vous surprendre on La Dépêche du Midi (21 September 2016)
 Florence Katz discography on Discogs
 Florence Katz on AllMusic
 Florence Katz on data.bnf.fr

French operatic mezzo-sopranos
Conservatoire de Paris alumni
Year of birth missing (living people)
Living people
People from Agen